The Federation of Ice Hockey League, Inc. (FIHL), also known as Hockey Philippines, is the national governing body for the sport of ice hockey in the Philippines. It handled the formation of the Philippine national team, together with the acquisition of foreign coaches, creating ice hockey tournaments around the country and partnering with different sponsors including SM Supermalls.

The FIHL was formed in February 2015, and was later admitted as an associate member of the International Ice Hockey Federation (IIHF) on May 20, 2016.

By July 2016, the federation had gained membership in the Philippine Olympic Committee (POC). The FIHL became a voting member of the POC in July 2020.

Leagues
Philippine Hockey League (2018–present)
Philippine Minor Hockey League (2018–present)

National teams
Men's national team
Men's U20 national team
Women's national team

Participation by year
2017

The Philippines did not enter in any 2017 IIHF World Championship tournaments.

2018

The Philippines did not enter in any 2018 IIHF World Championship tournaments.

2019

The Philippines did not enter in any 2019 IIHF World Championship tournaments.

2020
The Philippines was supposed to enter the inaugural Division IV tournament of the 2020 IIHF World Championships, but the tournament was cancelled due to the COVID-19 pandemic.

2021
No IIHF tournaments were held due to the COVID-19 pandemic.

References

External links
Hockey Philippines
IIHF Profile

2015 establishments in the Philippines
Ice hockey governing bodies in Asia
Ice hockey in the Philippines
International Ice Hockey Federation members
Ice
Sports organizations established in 2015